Poteet High School is a public high school located in Poteet, Texas (USA) and classified as a 4A school by the UIL. It is part of the Poteet Independent School District located in central Atascosa County. In 2013, the school was rated "Met Standard" by the Texas Education Agency.

Athletics
The Poteet Aggies compete in the following sports 

Baseball
Basketball
Cross Country
Football
Powerlifting
Soccer
Softball
Tennis
Track and Field
Volleyball

References

External links
 

Schools in Atascosa County, Texas
Public high schools in Texas